Teterino is a rural locality (a village) in Vorshinskoye Rural Settlement, Sobinsky District, Vladimir Oblast, Russia. The population was 6 as of 2010.

Geography 
Teterino is located on the Kolochka River, 33 km northeast of Sobinka (the district's administrative centre) by road. Buzakovo is the nearest rural locality.

References 

Rural localities in Sobinsky District